Charles L. Grigsby (August 15, 1928 – July 15, 2003) was an American professional basketball player. Grigsby was selected in the 1952 NBA draft by the Baltimore Bullets after a collegiate career at Dayton. He played for the New York Knicks in 1954–55 in only seven games, averaging 2.3 points, 1.6 rebounds and 1.0 assists per contest.  He was later an assistant coach at the University of Dayton with close friend and colleague, Don Donoher.  Prior to that he coached and taught at Stivers High School. He had one daughter, Nancy Grigsby, who co-founded Artemis Center, Alternatives to Domestic Violence in Dayton, Ohio.

References

External links
Stivers High School Hall of Fame entry

1928 births
2003 deaths
American men's basketball players
Baltimore Bullets (1944–1954) draft picks
Basketball players from Dayton, Ohio
Dayton Flyers men's basketball coaches
Dayton Flyers men's basketball players
High school basketball coaches in the United States
New York Knicks players
Small forwards